Robin Haase was the two-time defending champion, but lost in the semifinals to Marcel Granollers.  Granollers went on to win the title, defeating Juan Mónaco in the final, 0–6, 7–6(7–3), 6–4.

Seeds
The top four seeds receive a bye into the second round.

Draw

Finals

Top half

Bottom half

Qualifying

Seeds

Qualifiers

Lucky losers
  Aldin Šetkić

Qualifying draw

First qualifier

Second qualifier

Third qualifier

Fourth qualifier

References
 Main Draw
 Qualifying Draw

2013 ATP World Tour
2013 Singles